Luis Armando Espinoza, a 31-year-old Argentinian citizen, died during a police raid in the northern province of Tucumán, Argentina, in the context of the COVID-19 pandemic lockdown in the country.

After his body was found, an investigation (Luis Espinoza case, Caso Luis Espinoza in Spanish) revealed that he was shot to death after being wrongly suspected of engaging in an illegal horse race. Covered in plastic and rug, his body was moved to a police precinct. It was then placed inside a car trunk which traveled to the neighboring province of Catamarca where his body was dropped into a ravine.

The public opinion traced similarities between his murder and the Santiago Maldonado case.

In June 2020, the UN launched an investigation on the crime, through the OHCHR.

Victim 
Luis Espinoza was a 31-year-old rural worker, from the town of Melcho, Tucumán and a father of six. He had seventeen brothers.

Arrest and death 
On May 15, 2020, while Argentina was under a nationwide quarantine because of the COVID-19 pandemic, Luis Espinoza was found by police on the northern town of Simoca, Tucumán, where an illegal horse race was taking place. The conduct of the said activity was in violation of the quarantine policies. The victim was riding a horse along his brother Juan in the vicinity of the race, when nine police officers and a municipal security guards arrived to stop the illegal event.

At least four police officers had a struggle with Juan and, when his brother Luis tried to defend him, he fell off his horse and ran; being later shot at his back with a police service gun. The bullet entered through his left shoulder blade, piercing his lung.

His body was then moved to the Monteagudo police precinct, where for four hours, it was being readied to be disposed. The corpse was stripped into a flag pole with plastic bags and a rug. He died in some moment between the shooting and the moving to the police precinct.

His body left the precinct inside the car trunk of Rubén Montenegro, deputy commissioner, and he was transported 75 miles to the border of the Catamarca province, where he was dropped into a ravine.

On May 16, 2020, Luis' family tried to file a police report for his disappearance, in the very same precinct where his dead body was taken. The policeman declined the chance to file a report before 72 hours since his disappearance. After several days, the policeman admitted of having a silence pact and later on, informed the location of the body. It was found in La Banderita, Catamarca, on May 22, 2020, inside a 492 feet-deep ravine.

Once the corpse was found, an autopsy and ballistics report established that the bullet causing the deadly wound came from a police service gun, a Jericho 941 (an Israeli tactic .9mm pistol) that belonged to José Morales, one of the accused policemen.

The usage of this weapon by the Tucuman security forces had been under question two years prior to the Luis Espinoza case, since it is not a common weapon for security forces in any other area of Argentina. This resulted in a criminal case for fraudulent administration against the province civil servants, which was dismissed.

Indictments 
Several security forces members were accused for Luis Espinoza's crime, under the crimes of forced disappearance followed by death and kidnapping.

 José Morales
 Rubén Montenegro 
 Miriam González 
 René Ardiles 
 Víctor Salinas
 Carlos Romano 
 José Paz 
 Gerardo González Rojas 
 Claudio Zelaya 
 Fabio Santillán (municipal security guard)

On May 20, 2020, judge Mario Velázquez order the pre-trial detention for the length of six months for six of the ten accused. The prosecutor had requested a 12-months remand.

See also 
 Death of Santiago Maldonado
 List of solved missing person cases

References 

 

2020 deaths
2020 in Argentina 
2020 crimes in Argentina 
2020s missing person cases
Deaths in police custody in Argentina
Enforced disappearances in Argentina
Formerly missing people
Missing person cases in Argentina
Police misconduct in Argentina
Trials in Argentina